Pavel Peter Gojdič (also known as Pavol Gojdič or Peter Gojdič) (17 July 1888 — 17 July 1960), was a Rusyn Basilian monk and the eparch of the Slovak Catholic Eparchy of Prešov. He was imprisoned by the communist regime in Czechoslovakia. He was beatified by Pope John Paul II in 2001 and recognised as Righteous Among the Nations by Yad Vashem in 2007.

Early life
Gojdič (pronunciation Goydich) was born on 17 July 1888 at Ruske Peklany near Presov (Prjasev), the third child of the Byzantine Catholic priest Stefan Gojdic; his mother's name was Anna Gerberyova. He received the name of Peter in baptism.

Gojdič attended elementary school at Cigelka, Bardejov, and Presov, finishing his primary studies at Presov in 1907. He began his study of theology at Presov and continued them a year later at the major seminary in Budapest. He and his brother Cornelius were ordained on 27 August 1911, after which Gojdič worked for a brief period as assistant parish priest with his father.

Pastoral work

In the autumn of 1912, after a short period of pastoral work, he was appointed prefect of the Eparchial Boarding School for boys in Presov, known as "The Alumneum." At the same time he became an instructor of religion in the city's higher secondary schools. He was also entrusted with the spiritual care of the faithful in Sabinov as assistant parish priest. Gojdič was appointed to the Bishop's Chancery Office, where eventually he achieved the rank of Chancellor. A career as a diocesan administrator did not attract him, so he decided to become a Basilian monk. On 20 July 1922 Gojdič entered St. Nicholas Monastery on Chernecha Hora, near Mukachevo, where taking the habit on 27 January 1923, he took the name Pavel.

Appointed Director of the Apostleship of Prayer, he became instrumental in spreading the practice of frequent confession and Holy Communion throughout the Eparchy of Mukachevo. He usually spent long hours, mostly at night, in the chapel before the tabernacle. In 1927 he was appointed titular Bishop of Harpasa and was consecrated on 25 March in the Roman Basilica of San Clemente by Bishop Dionisije Njaradi.

After his episcopal ordination he visited the Basilica of St. Peter in Rome, where he prayed on the tomb of the apostle. On 29 March 1927, together with Bishop Njaradi, he was received in a private audience by Pope Pius XI. The pope gave Gojdič a gold pectoral cross, saying: "This cross is only a symbol of all those heavy crosses that you will have to carry during your episcopal ministry."

Gojdič had been named apostolic administrator of the Eparchy of Presov on 14 September 1926. His first official act in this office was to address a pastoral letter on the occasion of the 1100th anniversary of the birth of St. Cyril, apostle of the Slavs. Gojdič was proud of his Slavic heritage and was very fond of his oriental rite.

Bishop
In 1940 the pope appointed him Bishop of Presov, and for the year 1939 apostolic administrator of Mukacheve.

During the period before World War II, he decided to defend the Ruthenians and others against the onslaught of Slovak nationalism. From the beginning of their persecution in Slovakia, Gojdič spoke up openly in favor of the Jewish population. On 25 January 1939, two days after the establishment of a special committee by the Slovak autonomist government charged with defining the "Program for the Solution of the Jewish Question," the bishop wrote a letter addressed to all parishes in his Prešov diocese; in the letter, he predicted disastrous results caused by these discriminatory policies. After the Slovak parliament confirmed a special law permitting the expulsion of Jews from Slovakia, Gojdič wrote a protest against the cruel deportations which were being carried out by the clerical Hlinka Party. On 31 March 1942, Gojdič suggested to Giuseppe Burzio that President Jozef Tiso ought to resign, or if he refused, be laicized for his complicity in the deportation of Jews.

During the war the bishop helped refugees and prisoners, and rescued inmates of concentration camps. On 26 October 1942, Slovak security services informed the Ministry of the Interior of a high number of fictitious conversions taking place. The report pointed out several cases where only one member of a Jewish family converted to Christianity in order to protect all the other members. Out of 249 Jewish families, 533 Jews had converted to the Greek Catholic or Russian Orthodox faith in order to rescue some 1500 other members of their families, who had not converted; moreover, most of those who had converted continued to actively practice Judaism either in the open or undercover. According to the security service report, Gojdič had held a conversion ceremony in the town of Michalovce.

After the end of hostilities, those who had been saved by Gojdič foresaw that his wartime actions would not be well received by the new Communist government and offered to help him emigrate to the West. However, Gojdič refused to leave his post as bishop. Foreseeing the Communist takeover, with the help of a new auxiliary, Bishop Hopko, he launched a campaign to reinforce the faith of his people by mobilizing every possible means: visits, missions, retreats, the press and the radio. Gojdič resisted any initiative to submit the Greek Catholics to Russian Orthodoxy, assisted by the Communist Party, while he knew he was risking persecution, arrest and maybe even death. Even though he was put under severe pressure to renounce the Catholic faith and break unity with the Pope, he refused every offer. Gradually he was isolated from the clergy and the faithful.

On 28 April 1950, the Communist state outlawed the Greek Catholic Church and Gojdič was arrested and interned. Jewish witnesses wrote a letter in his defense to the then-Prime Minister of Czechoslovakia Antonín Zápotocký, but to no avail. In January 1951, in a trial set up against three 'high treason' bishops (Vojtaššák, Buzalka, and Gojdič) he was given a life sentence. Transferred from one prison to another, he remained faithful, praying and saying Divine Liturgy in secret, despite facing torture. Following an amnesty in 1953, given by Zapotocký, his life sentence was changed to 25 years detention. He was then 66 and his health continued to deteriorate, yet all further requests for amnesty were refused.

At the prison of Ruzyň an official informed him that from there he could go straight to Prešov, on condition that he was willing to become patriarch of the Orthodox Church in Czechoslovakia. He rejected the offer as an infidelity to the Pope and the faithful, and remained in prison.

He died of terminal cancer in the prison hospital of Leopoldov Prison in 1960, on his 72nd birthday. He was buried in an anonymous grave, n. 681, in the cemetery.

Veneration
In 1968, his remains were moved to Prešov, and since 1990 have been kept in a sarcophagus in the Greek-Catholic Cathedral of St. John the Baptist. On 4 November 2001, he was beatified by Pope John Paul II, who during his visit in Slovakia, while visiting Prešov, prayed at his tomb in the chapel of the cathedral.

Gojdič was legally rehabilitated on 27 September 1990. Subsequently, he was decorated posthumously with the Order of T. G. Masaryk – Second Class, and with the Cross of Pribina – First Class.

He was honored in Bratislava by the Yad Vashem Holocaust Memorial in 2007 as one of the Righteous Among the Nations.

Legacy
"I am certain that at the end truth will triumph over lies, and love will overcome hatred. I do not hate my enemies. I would like to bring them closer to Christ, of course not by force or deceit but by love and truth."

Pope John Paul II: "Known to the people as 'the man with a heart of gold,' he became known to the representatives of the government of the time as a real 'thorn in the side.' After the Communist regime made the Greek Catholic Church illegal, he was arrested and imprisoned. Thus for him began a long calvary of suffering, mistreatment and humiliation which brought about his death on account of his fidelity to Christ and his love for the Church and the Pope."

References

External links
Blessed Pavol Gojdic at CatholicSaints.info
Bishop Bl. Pavel Peter Gojdic, O.S.B.M. at Catholic-Hierarchy.org
Blessed Pavel Peter Gojdic (1888–1960), martyr at Catholicireland.net 
Timeline of bl. Pavol Peter Gojdič, OSBM (in Slovakian)

1888 births
1960 deaths
People from Prešov District
Rusyn people
Slovak Eastern Catholics
Order of Saint Basil the Great
Slovak Greek Catholic bishops
20th-century Eastern Catholic bishops
Slovak anti-fascists
Catholic resistance to Nazi Germany
People convicted of treason against Czechoslovakia
Prisoners sentenced to life imprisonment by Czechoslovakia
Slovak people who died in prison custody
Prisoners who died in Czechoslovak detention
20th-century Eastern Catholic martyrs
20th-century Roman Catholic martyrs
Recipients of the Order of Tomáš Garrigue Masaryk
Recipients of the Pribina Cross
Slovak beatified people
Eastern Catholic beatified people
Beatifications by Pope John Paul II
Eastern Catholic Righteous Among the Nations